Arapai is a settlement in Eastern Uganda. It is a suburb of the town of Soroti, in Soroti District, in the Teso sub-region.

Location
The coordinates of Arapai are:1° 46' 48.00"N, 33° 37' 30.00"E (Latitude:1.7800; Longitude:33.6250).

Population
As of December 2013, the exact population of Arapai is not publicly known.

Points of interest
The following points of interest are found in or near Arapai:

 The Arapai Campus of Busitema University - Home to the Faculty of Crop and Animal Science.
 The main campus of Soroti University of Science and Technology
 The campus of Teso College - A boarding boys-only middle (S1-S4) and high (S5-S6) school
 The Soroti-Amuria Road - The road passes through Arapai.

External links
Soroti District Information Portal
Road Distance Between Arapai and Amuria is Approximately

See also
Soroti
Soroti District
Teso sub-region
Busitema University

References

Populated places in Eastern Region, Uganda
Cities in the Great Rift Valley
Soroti District